High Society is the second studio album by American hip hop group Kottonmouth Kings. It was released June 27, 2000 under Suburban Noize Records and Capitol Records. The album peaked at number 65 on the Billboard 200 chart on July 15, 2000. The song "Peace Not Greed" peaked at number 37 on the Hot Modern Rock Tracks chart, with its accompanying music video being featured on MTV's Total Request Live as a "Close Call". The song "Crucial" along with a short FMV were included in the PS1 game T.J. Lavin's Ultimate BMX.

Track listing

Personnel
Daddy X - Vocals, Lyrics
D-Loc - Vocals, Lyrics
Johnny Richter - Vocals, Lyrics
Lou Dogg - Drums, Percussion
DJ Bobby B - DJ, Engineering, Turntables, Programmer
Dog Boy - Vocals, Lyrics ("Here We Go Again (Bump 2000)", "Face Facts", "Crucial")
Corporate Avenger - Vocals, Lyrics ("Peace Not Greed")
T.S.O.L. - Vocals, Lyrics  ("Peace Not Greed")
Sen Dog - Vocals, Lyrics ("We The People")
Insane Clown Posse - Vocals, Lyrics ("Wickit Clowns")
Grand Vanacular - Vocals, Lyrics ("Size Of An Ant")
Eric E-Man Adger - Producer (Kings Blend)

Chart positions

References

Kottonmouth Kings albums
2000 albums
Suburban Noize Records albums
Capitol Records albums